Kamen Rider may refer to:

 Kamen Rider, a manga and tokusatsu television franchise, including: 
 Kamen Rider (1971 TV series)
 Kamen Rider (1979 TV series)
 12796 Kamenrider, an asteroid named after the series

See also